Vinylpyridine may refer to:

 2-Vinylpyridine
 3-Vinylpyridine
 4-Vinylpyridine